Culcabock is a former hamlet in Highland Council Area, Scotland.

References

Areas of Inverness